Ahmed Ibrahim (born 8 April 1971) is an Egyptian wrestler. He competed in the men's Greco-Roman 62 kg at the 1992 Summer Olympics.

References

External links
 

1971 births
Living people
Egyptian male sport wrestlers
Olympic wrestlers of Egypt
Wrestlers at the 1992 Summer Olympics
Place of birth missing (living people)